The 2004 NBA playoffs was the postseason tournament of the National Basketball Association's 2003–04 season. The tournament concluded with the Eastern Conference champion Detroit Pistons defeating the Western Conference champion Los Angeles Lakers four games to one in the NBA Finals. Chauncey Billups was named NBA Finals MVP.

Overview
The 2004 playoffs was the first appearance for the Memphis Grizzlies in their nine year history which began in Vancouver. However, they failed to win a single game in their first 3 playoff appearances (2004, 2005, 2006), before earning their first playoff game and series victories in 2011. 

The Minnesota Timberwolves, entered their eighth consecutive post season.

The Denver Nuggets' made the playoffs for the first time since 1995.

The New Orleans Hornets made their final postseason appearance as a member of the East. They would not make the playoffs again until 2008, as a member of the West (the result of a realignment with the addition of the Charlotte Bobcats in the 2004–05 NBA season). Their playoff series with the Miami Heat, led by Dwyane Wade, was the last playoff series where the home team won all seven games until 2008's Boston–Atlanta and Boston–Cleveland playoff series.

The Houston Rockets made playoffs for the first time since 1999. As a result, 2004 was the first time in 14 years that all Texas teams made the playoffs, and the second time (first in ten years) that all former ABA teams made the playoffs. This was Steve Francis' only career playoff appearance.

The Miami Heat and the New York Knicks both made the playoffs for the first time since 2001. This marked Dwyane Wade’s first postseason appearance and the start of four straight playoff appearances for the Heat. For the Knicks, on the other hand, this was their last appearance until 2011.

The Portland Trail Blazers and Utah Jazz missed the playoffs for the first time since 1982 and 1983, respectively.

Game 4 of the Spurs-Grizzlies series was the last NBA game ever played Pyramid Arena. That game and Game 3 of the same series were the only playoff games to take place in The Pyramid before the Grizzlies moved to FedExForum in the autumn of 2004.

With their series win over the Denver Nuggets, the Minnesota Timberwolves won their first playoff series in franchise history.

With their first round series loss to the Sacramento Kings, the Dallas Mavericks lost a first round playoff series for the first time since 1990. As of 2023, this remains the Kings’ most recent series victory.

Game 5 of the Spurs-Lakers series was extremely notable for both teams’ last shots. Tim Duncan scored a two-pointer to give the Spurs a 73-72 lead with 0.4 seconds remaining. However, Derek Fisher would hit the game winning shot as time expired to give the Lakers a 74-73 victory in San Antonio.

With their conference semifinals victory over the Miami Heat, the Indiana Pacers made the Eastern Conference Finals for the first time since their NBA Finals run in 2000, after which they significantly changed the makeup of their team (yet still made the playoffs every year). 

With their conference semifinals victory over the Sacramento Kings, the Minnesota Timberwolves made their first conference finals appearance in franchise history. As of 2023, this remains the Timberwolves’ most recent series victory.

Game 2 of the Pistons-Pacers series was notable for Tayshaun Prince’s block of Reggie Miller’s late game layup.

Game 6 of the Timberwolves-Lakers series was the last Minnesota Timberwolves postseason game until 2018.

With their Conference Finals win over the Indiana Pacers, the Detroit Pistons made the NBA Finals for the first time since 1990.

In a shocking upset, the Detroit Pistons beat the Los Angeles Lakers in five games to win the NBA Championship.

Playoff qualifying

Eastern Conference

Best record in NBA
The Indiana Pacers clinched the best record in the NBA and had earned home court advantage throughout the entire playoffs. However, when Indiana lost to the Detroit Pistons in the Eastern Conference Finals, home court advantage for the NBA Finals switched to the Western Conference champion Los Angeles Lakers, who had posted a better regular season record at 56–26 than the Eastern Conference champion Detroit Pistons at 54–28.

Clinched a playoff berth
The following teams clinched a playoff berth in the East:

Indiana Pacers (61–21) (clinched Central division)
Detroit Pistons (54–28) 
New Jersey Nets (47–35) (clinched Atlantic division)
Miami Heat (42–40)
New Orleans Hornets (41–41)
Milwaukee Bucks (41–41)
New York Knicks (39–43)
Boston Celtics (36–46)

Western Conference

Best record in conference
The Minnesota Timberwolves clinched the best record in the Western Conference and had home court advantage throughout the Western Conference playoffs.  However, when Minnesota lost to the Los Angeles Lakers in the Western Conference Finals, the Lakers gained home court advantage for the NBA Finals because the Lakers posted a better regular season record at 56-26 than the Eastern Conference champion Detroit Pistons at 54–28.

Clinched a playoff berth
The following teams clinched a playoff berth in the West:

Minnesota Timberwolves (58–24) (clinched Midwest division)
San Antonio Spurs (57–25) 
Los Angeles Lakers (56–26) (clinched Pacific division)
Sacramento Kings (55–27)
Dallas Mavericks (52–30)
Memphis Grizzlies (50–32)
Houston Rockets (45–37)
Denver Nuggets (43–39)

Bracket

First round
All times are in Eastern Daylight Time (UTC−4)

Eastern Conference first round

(1) Indiana Pacers vs. (8) Boston Celtics

This was the fourth playoff meeting between these two teams, with the Celtics winning the first three meetings.

(2) New Jersey Nets vs. (7) New York Knicks

This was the third playoff meeting between these two teams, with the Knicks winning the first two meetings.

(3) Detroit Pistons vs. (6) Milwaukee Bucks

This was the third playoff meeting between these two teams, with the Pistons winning the first two meetings.

(4) Miami Heat vs. (5) New Orleans Hornets

In Game 1, Dwyane Wade hits the game winner with 1.3 seconds left.
This was the first playoff meeting between the Heat and the New Orleans Pelicans/Hornets franchise.

Western Conference first round

(1) Minnesota Timberwolves vs. (8) Denver Nuggets

This was the first playoff meeting between the Nuggets and the Timberwolves.

(2) Los Angeles Lakers vs. (7) Houston Rockets

This was the seventh playoff meeting between these two teams, with each team winning three series apiece.

(3) San Antonio Spurs vs. (6) Memphis Grizzlies

This was the first playoff meeting between the Grizzlies and the Spurs.

(4) Sacramento Kings vs. (5) Dallas Mavericks

This was the third playoff meeting between these two teams, with each team winning one series apiece.

Conference semifinals

Eastern Conference semifinals

(1) Indiana Pacers vs. (4) Miami Heat

Recap

This was the first playoff meeting between the Pacers and the Heat.

(3) Detroit Pistons vs. (2) New Jersey Nets

In Game 5, Chauncey Billups hits a half court buzzer beater to send the game to OT. 12 years later, Kyle Lowry of the Toronto Raptors would do the same in Game 1 against the Miami Heat in their second round matchup.

This was the third playoff meeting between these two teams, with each team winning one series apiece.

Western Conference semifinals

(1) Minnesota Timberwolves vs. (4) Sacramento Kings

This was the first playoff meeting between the Timberwolves and the Kings.

(3) San Antonio Spurs vs. (2) Los Angeles Lakers

In the final seconds of Game 5, Tim Duncan hits a fadeaway shot over Shaquille O'Neal to give the Spurs the lead, but with 0.4 seconds left, Derek Fisher off the inbounds pass hits a miracle buzzer beater to give the Lakers the victory.

This was the tenth playoff meeting between these two teams, with the Lakers winning six of the first nine meetings.

Conference finals

Eastern Conference finals

(1) Indiana Pacers vs. (3) Detroit Pistons

This was the second playoff meeting between these two teams, with the Pistons winning the first meeting.

Western Conference finals

(1) Minnesota Timberwolves vs. (2) Los Angeles Lakers

This was the second playoff meeting between these two teams, with the Lakers winning the first meeting.

NBA Finals: (W2) Los Angeles Lakers vs. (E3) Detroit Pistons

In Game 2, Kobe Bryant hits the game-tying 3 with 2.1 seconds left to force OT.
Game 4 is Karl Malone's final NBA game.

This was the 12th playoff meeting between these two teams, with the Lakers winning nine of the first 11 meetings.

References

External links
NBA.com's section for the 2004 NBA Playoffs

National Basketball Association playoffs
Playoffs

fi:NBA-kausi 2003–2004#Pudotuspelit